Alfred Damon Runyon (October 4, 1880 – December 10, 1946) was an American newspaperman and short-story writer.

He was best known for his short stories celebrating the world of Broadway in New York City that grew out of the Prohibition era. To New Yorkers of his generation, a "Damon Runyon character" evoked a distinctive social type from Brooklyn or Midtown Manhattan. The adjective "Runyonesque" refers to this type of character and the type of situations and dialog that Runyon depicts.

He spun humorous and sentimental tales of gamblers, hustlers, actors, and gangsters, few of whom go by "square" names, preferring instead colorful monikers such as  "Nathan Detroit", "Benny Southstreet", "Big Jule", "Harry the Horse", "Good Time Charley", "Dave the Dude", or "The Seldom Seen Kid".  

His distinctive vernacular style is known as "Runyonese": a mixture of formal speech and colorful slang, almost always in the present tense, and always devoid of contractions. He is credited with coining the phrase "Hooray Henry", a term now used in British English to describe the upper-class version of a loud-mouthed, arrogant twit.

Runyon's fictional world is also known to the general public through the musical Guys and Dolls based on two of his stories, "The Idyll of Miss Sarah Brown" and "Blood Pressure". The musical additionally borrows characters and story elements from a few other Runyon stories, most notably "Pick The Winner". The film Little Miss Marker (and its three remakes, Sorrowful Jones, 40 Pounds of Trouble and the 1980 Little Miss Marker) grew from his short story of the same name.

Runyon was also a newspaper reporter, covering sports and general news for decades for various publications and syndicates owned by William Randolph Hearst. Already known for his fiction, he wrote a well-remembered "present tense" article on Franklin Delano Roosevelt's Presidential inauguration in 1933 for the Universal Service, a Hearst syndicate, which was merged with the co-owned International News Service in 1937.

Life and work

Damon Runyon was born Alfred Damon Runyan to Alfred Lee and Elizabeth (Damon) Runyan. His relatives in his birthplace of Manhattan, Kansas, included several newspapermen. His grandfather was a newspaper printer from New Jersey who had relocated to Manhattan, Kansas, in 1855, and his father was the editor of his newspaper in the town. In 1882 Runyon's father was forced to sell his newspaper, and the family moved westward. The family eventually settled in Pueblo, Colorado, in 1887, where Runyon spent the rest of his youth. By most accounts, he attended school only through the fourth grade. He began to work in the newspaper trade under his father in Pueblo. In present-day Pueblo, Runyon Field, the Damon Runyon Repertory Theater Company, and Runyon Lake are named in his honor.

In 1898, when still in his teens, Runyon enlisted in the US Army to fight in the Spanish–American War. While in the service, he was assigned to write for the Manila Freedom and Soldier's Letter.

After military service, he worked for Colorado newspapers, beginning in Pueblo. His first job as a reporter was in September 1900, when he was hired by the Pueblo Star; he then worked in the Rocky Mountain area during the first decade of the 1900s: at the Denver Daily News, he served as "sporting editor" (today a "sports editor") and then as a staff writer. His expertise was in covering the semi-professional teams in Colorado. He briefly managed a semi-pro team in Trinidad, Colorado. At one of the newspapers where he worked, the spelling of his last name was changed from "Runyan" to "Runyon", a change he let stand.

After failing in an attempt to organize a Colorado minor baseball league, which lasted less than a week, Runyon moved to New York City in 1910. In his first New York byline, the American editor dropped the "Alfred" and the name "Damon Runyon" appeared for the first time. For the next ten years, he covered the New York Giants and professional boxing for the New York American.

He was the Hearst newspapers' baseball columnist for many years, beginning in 1911, and his knack for spotting the eccentric and the unusual, on the field or in the stands, is credited with revolutionizing the way baseball was covered. Perhaps as confirmation, Runyon was voted 1967 J. G. Taylor Spink Award by the Baseball Writers' Association of America (BBWAA), for which he was honored at ceremonies at the National Baseball Hall of Fame in July 1968, and added to what is commonly referred to as the "writers wing" of the Hall. He is also a member of the International Boxing Hall Of Fame and is known for dubbing heavyweight champion James J. Braddock, the "Cinderella Man". Runyon frequently contributed sports poems to the American on boxing and baseball themes and wrote numerous short stories and essays. 
 
One year, while covering spring training in Texas, he met Pancho Villa in a bar and later accompanied the unsuccessful American expedition into Mexico searching for Villa. It was while he was in Mexico that he met the young girl whom he eventually married.

Gambling, particularly on craps or horse races, was a common theme of Runyon's works, and he was a notorious gambler. One of his paraphrases from a line in Ecclesiastes ran: "The race is not always to the swift, nor the battle to the strong, but that's how the smart money bets."

A heavy drinker as a young man, he seems to have quit drinking soon after arriving in New York, after his drinking nearly cost him the courtship of the woman who became his first wife, Ellen Egan. He remained a heavy smoker.

His best friend was mobster accountant Otto Berman, and he incorporated Berman into several of his stories under the alias "Regret, the horse player". When Berman was killed in a hit on Berman's boss, Dutch Schultz, Runyon quickly assumed the role of damage control for his deceased friend, correcting erroneous press releases (including one that stated Berman was one of Schultz's gunmen, to which Runyon replied, "Otto would have been as effective a bodyguard as a two-year-old.").

Runyon's marriage to Ellen Egan produced two children (Mary and Damon, Jr.), but broke up in 1928 over rumors that Runyon had become infatuated with Patrice Amati del Grande, a Mexican woman he had first met while covering the Pancho Villa raids in 1916 and discovered once again in New York when she called the American seeking him out. Runyon had promised her in Mexico that if she would complete the education he funded for her, he would find her a dancing job in New York. She became his companion after he separated from his wife. After Ellen Runyon's death, Runyon and del Grande married on July 7, 1932; that marriage ended in 1946 when she left him for a younger man.

Runyon died in New York City from throat cancer in late 1946, at age 66. His body was cremated, and his ashes were scattered from a DC-3 airplane over Broadway in Manhattan by Eddie Rickenbacker on December 18, 1946. This was an infringement of the law but widely approved. The family plot of Damon Runyon is located at Woodlawn Cemetery in The Bronx, New York.

Legacy
 After Runyon's death, his friend and fellow journalist, Walter Winchell, went on his radio program and appealed for contributions to help fight cancer, eventually establishing the Damon Runyon Cancer Memorial Fund to support scientific research into causes of, and prevention of, cancer.
 The first-ever telethon was hosted by Milton Berle in 1949 to raise funds for the Damon Runyon Cancer Research Foundation.
 Each year the Denver Press Club assigns the Damon Runyon Award to a prominent journalist. Past winners include Jimmy Breslin, Mike Royko, George Will and Bob Costas.
 Damon Runyon Elementary school in Littleton, Colorado is named after him.
 The Damon Runyon Stakes is a thoroughbred horse race run every December at Aqueduct Race Track. Runyon loved horse racing and ran a small stable of his own.
 In the mid-1930s, Runyon persuaded promoter Leo Seltzer to formally change his Roller Derby spectacle from a marathon roller-skating race into a full-contact team sport, an innovation that was eventually revived in a DIY spirit seven decades later.
 One block of West 45th Street (between 8th and 9th Avenues) in Manhattan's Hell's Kitchen is named Runyon's Way.
 The house in Manhattan, Kansas, where Runyon was born, is listed on the National Register of Historic Places.
 In 2008, The Library of America selected "The Eternal Blonde", Runyon's account of a 1927 murder trial, for inclusion in its two-century retrospective of American Crime Writing.
 Until January of 1944, the 515th B-24 bomber squadron "Satan's Kids", of the 376th Bomber Group named their bombers after Runyon "Gangster" characters ,

Literary style – the "Broadway" stories

The English comedy writer Frank Muir comments that Runyon's plots were, in the manner of O. Henry, neatly constructed with professionally wrought endings, but their distinction lay in the manner of their telling, as the author invented a peculiar argot for his characters to speak.  Runyon almost totally avoids the past tense (English humorist E.C. Bentley thought there was only one instance and was willing to "lay plenty of 6 to 5 that it is nothing but a misprint", but "was" appears in the short stories "The Lily of St Pierre" and "A Piece of Pie"; "had" appears in "The Lily of St Pierre", "Undertaker Song" and "Bloodhounds of Broadway"), and makes little use of the future tense, using the present for both. He also avoided the conditional, using instead the future indicative in situations that would normally require conditional. An example: "Now most any doll on Broadway will be very glad indeed to have Handsome Jack Madigan give her a tumble" (Guys and Dolls, "Social error"). Bentley comments that "there is a sort of ungrammatical purity about it [Runyon's resolute avoidance of the past tense], an almost religious exactitude."  There is an homage to Runyon that makes use of this peculiarity ("Chronic Offender" by Spider Robinson), which involves a time machine and a man going by the name "Harry the Horse".

He uses many slang terms (which go unexplained in his stories), such as:

 pineapple = pineapple grenade
 roscoe/john roscoe/the old equalizer/that thing = gun
 shiv = knife
 noggin = head
 snoot = nose

There are many recurring composite phrases such as:

 ever-loving wife (occasionally "ever-loving doll")
 more than somewhat (or "no little, and quite some"); this phrase was so typical that it was used as the title of one of his short story collections
 loathe and despise
 one and all

Bentley notes that Runyon's "telling use of the recurrent phrase and fixed epithet" demonstrates a debt to Homer.

Runyon's stories also employ occasional rhyming slang, similar to the cockney variety but native to New York (e.g.: "Miss Missouri Martin makes the following crack one night to her: 'Well, I do not see any Simple Simon on your lean and linger.' This is Miss Missouri Martin's way of saying she sees no diamond on Miss Billy Perry's finger." (from "Romance in the Roaring Forties")).

The comic effect of his style results partly from the juxtaposition of broad slang with mock-pomposity. Women, when not "dolls", "Judies", "pancakes", "tomatoes", or "broads", may be "characters of a female nature", for example. He typically avoided contractions such as "don't" in the example above, which also contributes significantly to the humorously pompous effect. In one sequence, a gangster tells another character to do as he is told, or else "find another world in which to live".

Runyon's short stories are told in the first person by a protagonist who is never named and whose role is unclear; he knows many gangsters and does not appear to have a job, but he does not admit to any criminal involvement, and seems to be largely a bystander.  He describes himself as "being known to one and all as a guy who is just around".  The radio program The Damon Runyon Theatre dramatized 52 of Runyon's works in 1949, and for these the protagonist was given the name "Broadway", although it was admitted that this was not his real name, much in the way "Harry the Horse" and "Sorrowful Jones" are aliases.

Literary works

Books

Poems
The Tents of Trouble (1911)
Rhymes of the Firing Line (1912)
Poems for Men (1947)

Story collections
Guys and Dolls (1932)
Blue Plate Special (1934)
Money From Home (1935)
More Than Somewhat (1937)
Furthermore (1938)
Take It Easy (1938)
My Wife Ethel (1939)
My Old Man (1939)
Runyon à la Carte (1944)
In Our Town (1946)
The Three Wise Guys and Other Stories (1946)
Damon Runyon Favorites (1946)
Trials and Other Tribulations (1947)

Collected newspaper columns
Short Takes (1946)

Compilations containing previously collected material
The Best of Runyon (1940)
Damon Runyon Favorites (1942)
The Damon Runyon Omnibus (1944)
Runyon First and Last (1949)
Runyon on Broadway (1950; introduction by E.C. Bentley)
More Guys and Dolls (1950)
The Turps (1951)
Damon Runyon from First to Last (1954)
A Treasury of Damon Runyon (1958)
The Bloodhounds of Broadway and Other Stories (1985)
Romance in the Roaring Forties and other stories (1986)
On Broadway (1990)Guys, Dolls, and Curveballs: Damon Runyon on Baseball (2005; Jim Reisler, editor)Guys and Dolls and Other Writings (2008; introduction by Pete Hamill)

PlayA Slight Case of Murder (with Howard Lindsay, 1940)

BiographyCapt. Eddie Rickenbacker (with W. Kiernan, 1942)

Stories
There are many collections of Runyon's stories, in particular Runyon on Broadway and Runyon from First to Last. A publisher's note in the latter claims that collection contains all of Runyon's short stories not included in Runyon on Broadway, but two Broadway stories originally published in Collier's Weekly are not in either collection: "Maybe a Queen" and "Leopard's Spots", both collected in More Guys And Dolls (1950). The radio show, in addition, has a story, "Joe Terrace", that appears in ‘More Guys and Dolls’ and the August 29, 1936, issue of Colliers. It is one of his "Our Town" stories that does not appear in the “In Our Town” book, and the only episode of the show which is not a Broadway’ story, however, the action is changed in the show from Our Town to Broadway.

The "Our Town" stories are short vignettes of life in a small town, largely based on Runyon's experiences in his home town of Pueblo, Colorado. They are written in a simple, descriptive style and contain twists and odd endings based on the personalities of the people involved. Each story's title is the name of the principal character. Twenty-seven of them were published in the 1946 book In Our Town.Runyon on Broadway contains the following stories:

More Than Somewhat
Breach of Promise
Romance in the Roaring Forties
Dream Street Rose
The Old Doll's House
Blood Pressure
The Bloodhounds of Broadway
Tobias the Terrible
The Snatching of Bookie Bob
The Lily of St. Pierre
Hold 'em, Yale
Earthquake
'Gentlemen, the King!'
A Nice Price
Broadway Financier
The Brain Goes Home

Furthermore
Madame La Gimp
Dancing Dan's Christmas
Sense of Humour
Lillian
Little Miss Marker
Pick the Winner
Undertaker Song
Butch Minds the Baby
The Hottest Guy in the World
The Lemon Drop Kid
What, No Butler?
The Three Wise Guys
A Very Honourable Guy
Princess O'Hara
Social Error

Take It Easy
Tight Shoes
Lonely Heart
The Brakeman's Daughter
Cemetery Bait
It Comes Up Mud
The Big Umbrella
For a Pal
Big Shoulders
That Ever-Loving Wife of Hymie's
Neat Strip
Bred for Battle
Too Much Pep
Baseball Hattie
Situation Wanted
A Piece of Pie
A Job for the Macarone
All Horse Players Die Broke

 Runyon from First to Last includes the following stories and sketches:

The First Stories	(early non-Broadway stories):
The Defence of Strikerville
Fat Fallon
Two Men Named Collins. First published in Reader Magazine, [Date Unknown]
As Between Friends
The Informal Execution of Soupbone Pew
My Father
Stories à la Carte (Broadway stories written in Runyonese):
Money from Home
A Story Goes With It
Broadway Complex
So You Won't Talk!

Dark Dolores
Delegates at Large
A Light in France
Old Em's Kentucky Home
Johnny One-Eye
Broadway Incident
The Idyll of Miss Sarah Brown
The Melancholy Dane
Barbecue
Little Pinks
Palm Beach Santa Claus
Cleo
The Lacework Kid

The Last Stories (Broadway stories written in Runyonese):
Blonde Mink
Big Boy Blues
Written in Sickness (sketches):
Why Me?
The Doctor Knows Best
No Life
Good Night
Bed-Warmers
Sweet Dreams
Passing the Word Along
Death Pays a Social Call
  In Our Town contains the following stories:

Our Old Man (originally titled On Good Turns)
Samuel Graze
Pete Hankins
Jeremiah Zore
Mrs. Judson
The Happiness Joneses
Mrs. McGregor
Doc Brackett
Officer Lipscomber

Marigold and Maidie So
Sterling Curlew
Doc Mindler
Mrs. Pilplay
Sheriff Harding
Boswell Van Dusen
Dr. Davenport
Mrs. Bogane
Sam Crable

Ancil Toombs
Amy Vederman
Peter Chowles
Judge Juggins
Banker Beaverbrook
Judge Joes
Angel Kake
Bet Ragle
Hank Smith

The following "Our Town" stories were not included in In Our Town:

Joe Terrace
Burge McCall
Lou Louder

Uncollected storiesThe Art of High Grading. Illustrated Sunday Magazine, 2 January 1910The Sucker. San Francisco Examiner, 10 July 1910Burge McCall. Collier's, 11 July 1936 (not in Runyonese)Lou Louder. Collier's, 8 August 1936 (not in Runyonese)Nothing Happens in Brooklyn. Collier's, 30 April 1938 (partly in Runyonese, but includes past tense)

Film

Twenty of his stories became motion pictures.Lady for a Day (1933) – Adapted by Robert Riskin, who suggested the name change from Runyon's title "Madame La Gimp". The film garnered Academy Award nominations for Best Picture, Best Director (Frank Capra), Best Actress (May Robson), and Best Adaptation for the Screen (Riskin). It was remade as Pocketful of Miracles in 1961, with Bette Davis in the Apple Annie role (fused with the "raggedy doll" from Runyon's short story "The Brain Goes Home"); Frank Sinatra recorded the upbeat title song (his rendition is not used in the film). The film received Oscar nominations for composers Sammy Cahn and Jimmy Van Heusen and for co-star Peter Falk (Best Supporting Actor). In 1989, Jackie Chan adapted the story yet again for the Hong Kong action film Miracles, adding several of his trademark stunt sequences.Little Miss Marker (1934) – The film that made Shirley Temple a star, launched her career, and pushed her past Greta Garbo as the nation's biggest film draw of the year. Also starred Charles Bickford. Subsequent remakes include Sorrowful Jones (1949) with Bob Hope and Lucille Ball; 40 Pounds of Trouble (1962) with Tony Curtis, and Little Miss Marker (1980) with Walter Matthau, Julie Andrews, Bob Newhart and Curtis.The Lemon Drop Kid (1934) – Starring Lee Tracy, remade in 1951 with Bob Hope (and I Love Lucy co-star William Frawley appearing in both adaptations); the latter version introduced the Christmas song "Silver Bells".Princess O'Hara (1935) – Starring Jean Parker, remade in 1943 as It Ain't Hay with Abbott and Costello and Patsy O'ConnorProfessional Soldier (1935) – an adventure story starring Victor McLaglen and Freddie BartholomewA Slight Case of Murder (1938) with Edward G. Robinson – remade in 1953 as Stop, You're Killing Me with Broderick Crawford and Claire TrevorJoe and Ethel Turp Call on the President (1939) with Ann Sothern, Lewis Stone and Walter Brennan.The Big Street (1942) – Henry Fonda, Lucille Ball (adapted from Runyon's story "Little Pinks")Butch Minds the Baby (1942) – Broderick Crawford, Shemp HowardJohnny One-Eye – (1950) Starring Pat O'Brien, Wayne Morris, Delores Moran, and Gayle ReedMoney from Home (1953)  – Starring Dean Martin and Jerry LewisGuys and Dolls (1955)  – Marlon Brando, Jean Simmons, Frank Sinatra, Vivian Blaine, and Stubby Kaye. Blaine and Kaye reprised their roles from the 1950 Broadway production. Adapted from the story "The Idyll of Miss Sarah Brown". The big craps game is adapted from the story "Blood Pressure".Bloodhounds of Broadway (1952) – Musical comedy starring Mitzi Gaynor and directed by Harmon JonesBloodhounds of Broadway (1989) – Ensemble cast starring Matt Dillon, Jennifer Grey, Madonna, and Julie Hagerty, among others. The film combines elements from four stories into one large one: "A Very Honorable  Guy", "The Brain Goes Home", "Social Error", and "The Bloodhounds of Broadway".

In 1938, his unproduced play Saratoga Chips became the basis of The Ritz Brothers film Straight, Place and Show.

Plays and musicalsA Slight Case of Murder (1935) co-written for Broadway with Howard LindsayGuys and Dolls (1950) starring Robert Alda (Sky Masterson), Vivian Blaine (Miss Adelaide), Sam Levene (Nathan Detroit), Isabel Bigley (Sarah Brown), Pat Rooney Sr., B.S. Pully, Stubby Kaye, Johnny Silver, Tom Pedi. Adapted from Runyon's stories "The Idyll of Miss Sarah Brown" and "Blood Pressure".

RadioThe Damon Runyon Theater radio series dramatized 52 of Runyon's short stories in weekly broadcasts running from October 1948 to September 1949 (with reruns until 1951).Goldin, David J. (2012). "The Damon Runyon Theatre", radioGOLDINdex database. Retrieved March 9, 2012. The series was produced by Alan Ladd's Mayfair Transcription Company for syndication to local radio stations. John Brown played the character "Broadway", who doubled as host and narrator. The cast also comprised Alan Reed, Luis Van Rooten, Joseph Du Val, Gerald Mohr, Frank Lovejoy, Herb Vigran, Sheldon Leonard, William Conrad, Jeff Chandler, Lionel Stander, Sidney Miller, Olive Deering and Joe De Santis. Pat O'Brien was initially engaged for the role of "Broadway". The original stories were adapted for the radio by Russell Hughes.

"Broadway's New York had a crisis each week, though the streets had a rose-tinged aura", wrote radio historian John Dunning. "The sad shows then were all the sadder; plays like For a Pal had a special poignance. The bulk of Runyon's work had been untapped by radio, and the well was deep."

TelevisionDamon Runyon Theatre aired on CBS-TV from 1955 to 1956.

Mike McShane told Runyon stories as monologues on British TV in 1994, and an accompanying book was released, both titled Broadway Stories.Three Wise Guys was a 2005 TV movie.

 See also 
 

References

Further reading

 Breslin, Jimmy (1991). Damon Runyon: A Life. London: Houghton Mifflin. 
 Clark, Tom (1978). The World of Damon Runyon. New York: Harper & Row. 
 D'Itri, Patricia Ward (1982). Damon Runyon. Boston: Twayne. 
 Hoyt, Edwin P (1964). A Gentleman of Broadway: The Story of Damon Runyon. Boston: Little Brown. 
 Mosedale, John (1981). The Men Who Invented Broadway: Damon Runyon, Walter Winchell & Their World. New York: Richard Marek Publishers. 
 Runyon, Damon Jr (1953). Father's Footsteps: The Story of Damon Runyon by his Son. New York: Random House
 Schwarz, Daniel R (2003). Broadway Boogie Woogie: Damon Runyon and the Making of New York City Culture. New York: Palgrave MacMillan. 
 Wagner, Jean (1965). Runyonese: The Mind and Craft of Damon Runyon. Paris: Stechert-Hafner. 
 Weiner, Ed (1948).  The Damon Runyon Story''. New York: Longmans Green.

External links

 
 
 
 Baseball Hall of Fame
 All the stories from: More than Somewhat, Furthermore, & Take it Easy at Project Gutenberg Australia
 Text of story "The Informal Execution of Soupbone Pew" at Project Gutenberg Australia
 The Damon Runyon Theatre – audio files of the complete series at the Internet Archive
 
 
 Damon Runyon Cancer Research Foundation and Broadway Theater Service
 Damon Runyon Papers. Yale Collection of American Literature, Beinecke Rare Book and Manuscript Library.
 https://damon-runyon.com “Damon Runyon’s Pueblo” Award-winning 40 minute film. KRMA TV Denver called “Damon Runyon’s Pueblo” “an eye-opening and vastly entertaining semi-documentary” on the author’s early, formative years in Pueblo, Colorado where he met historical figures such as Bat Masterson and Doc Holiday. Encyclopaedia Britannica said “few of his admirers know that many characters and incidents in Runyon’s stories were suggested by Pueblo people and experiences.”

1880 births
1946 deaths
American male journalists
American military personnel of the Spanish–American War
American short story writers
American sportswriters
Burials at Woodlawn Cemetery (Bronx, New York)
Deaths from cancer in New York (state)
Deaths from esophageal cancer
BBWAA Career Excellence Award recipients
American male short story writers
People from Pueblo, Colorado
Writers from Manhattan, Kansas
Ghostwriters